The 1961 National Football League draft took place at the Warwick Hotel in Philadelphia on December 27–28, 1960. The league would later hold an expansion draft for the Minnesota Vikings expansion franchise. This draft was also the first regular draft for the Dallas Cowboys as they had only participated in the 1960 NFL expansion draft that year.

The Cowboys held the worst record in the NFL the previous season, but selected second in this draft because the expansion Vikings were awarded the first overall pick. The Vikings used that pick to select running back Tommy Mason.

Player selections

Round one

 HOF Member of the Professional Football Hall of Fame

Round two

Round three

Round four

Round five

Round six

Round seven

Round eight

Round nine

Round ten

Round eleven

Round twelve

Round thirteen

Round fourteen

Round fifteen

Round sixteen

Round seventeen

Round eighteen

Round nineteen

Round twenty

Hall of Famers
 Herb Adderley, running back from Michigan State taken 1st round 14th overall by the Green Bay Packers.
Inducted: Professional Football Hall of Fame class of 1980.
 Bob Lilly, tackle from Texas Christian University taken 1st round 13th overall by the Dallas Cowboys.
Inducted: Professional Football Hall of Fame class of 1980,
 David "Deacon" Jones, defensive end from South Carolina State taken 14th round 186th overall by the Los Angeles Rams.
Inducted: Professional Football Hall of Fame class of 1980.
 Fran Tarkenton, quarterback from Georgia taken 3rd round 29th overall by the Minnesota Vikings.
Inducted: Professional Football Hall of Fame class of  1986.
 Mike Ditka, tight end from the University of Pittsburgh taken 1st round 5th overall by the Chicago Bears.
Inducted: Professional Football Hall of Fame class of 1988.
 James Earl "Jimmy" Johnson, running back from UCLA taken 1st round 6th overall by the San Francisco 49ers.
Inducted: Professional Football Hall of Fame class of 1994.
 Billy Shaw, offensive guard from Georgia Tech taken 14th round 184th overall by the Dallas Cowboys, signed by the Buffalo Bills of the AFL.
Inducted: Pro Football Hall of Fame class of 1999.

Notable undrafted players

See also
 1961 American Football League Draft

References

External links
 NFL.com – 1961 Draft
 databaseFootball.com – 1961 Draft
 Pro Football Hall of Fame

National Football League Draft
Draft
NFL Draft
1960s in Philadelphia
American football in Philadelphia
NFL Draft
Events in Philadelphia